Melastiza cornubiensis is a species of apothecial fungus belonging to the family Pyronemataceae.

This is a European species appearing from spring to autumn as bright orange-red disks clustered on sandy and gravelly soils.

References

Melastiza cornubiensis at Species Fungorum

Pezizales
Fungi described in 1854
Taxa named by Miles Joseph Berkeley
Taxa named by Christopher Edmund Broome